Tamalous is a district in Skikda Province, Algeria, on the Mediterranean Sea. It was named after its capital, Tamalous.

Municipalities
The district is further divided into 3 municipalities:
Tamalous
Kerkera
Bein El Ouidiène

Districts of Skikda Province